, is one of the original 40 throws of Judo as developed by Jigoro Kano. It belongs to the fifth group, Gokyo, of the traditional throwing list, Gokyo (no waza), of Kodokan Judo. It is also part of the current 67 Throws of Kodokan Judo. It is classified as a hand technique, Te-waza.

Similar techniques, variants, and aliases 
English aliases:
 corner drop

Similar techniques:
 uki otoshi

External links
 The Kodokan's page on sumi-otoshi

References 

Judo technique
Throw (grappling)